The bottomland hardwood forest is a type of deciduous and evergreen hardwood forest found in broad lowland floodplains along large rivers and lakes in the United States and elsewhere.  They are occasionally flooded, which builds up the alluvial soils required for the gum, oak and bald cypress trees that typically grow in this type of biome.  The trees often develop unique characteristics to allow submergence, including cypress knees and fluted trunks, but can not survive continuous flooding.    

Typical examples of this forest type are found throughout the Gulf Coast states, and along the Mississippi River in the United States.

References

Temperate broadleaf and mixed forests in the United States
Forest ecology